Solheim is a surname. People with the surname include:

Eirik Solheim (born 1960), Norwegian physician
Elling M. Solheim (1905–1971), Norwegian writer
Erik Solheim (born 1955), Norwegian politician
Espen Solheim (born 1976), Norwegian football player
Fabian Wilkens Solheim (born 1996), Norwegian alpine ski racer
Iselin Solheim (born 1990), Norwegian singer
Iselin Moen Solheim (born 1995), Norwegian freestyle wrestler
Jorun Solheim (born 1944), Norwegian social anthropologist and women's studies academic
Karsten Solheim (1911–2000), Norwegian-born American golf club designer and businessman
Ken Solheim (born 1961), Canadian ice hockey forward
Leif Solheim (born 1932), Norwegian ice hockey player
Maria Solheim (born 1982), Norwegian singer-songwriter
Mats Solheim (born 1987), Norwegian football player
Mona Solheim (born 1979), Norwegian taekwondo athlete
Nina Solheim (born 1979), Norwegian taekwondo athlete
Øivind Solheim (1928–2017), Norwegian ice hockey player
Robert Solheim, electronic music composer from Norway
Svale Solheim (1903–1971), Norwegian folklorist
Torolv Solheim (1907–1995), Norwegian educator, essayist, resistance member and politician
Wilhelm Solheim (1924–2014), American anthropologist specializing in Southeast Asia
Wilhelm Solheim (botanist) (1898–1978), American botanist

Norwegian-language surnames